Unio cariei was a species of medium-sized freshwater mussel, an aquatic bivalve mollusc in the family Unionidae.

This species was endemic to the island of Réunion in the Indian Ocean, but it is now extinct.

References

cariei
Extinct invertebrates since 1500
Extinct bivalves
Molluscs of Réunion
Taxonomy articles created by Polbot